Louis H. Chrispijn, Sr. (13 May 1854, in Amsterdam – 1 November 1926, in Amsterdam) was a Dutch actor, writer, and director of both theatre and films. Together with M.H. Laddé, Willy Mullens, Maurits Binger, and Theo Frenkel, he was one of the pioneers of early Dutch cinema. 

He and his wife, actress Christine van Meeteren, married in 1905 and toured the Dutch East Indies together through 1908. Chrispijn became Hollandia's first permanent director in 1915. He and van Meeteren divorced the following year.

Movies (as director)
 De Levende ladder (1913)
 Nederland en Oranje (1913)
 Silvia Silombra (1913)
 Krates (1913)
 De Bertha (1914)
 Een telegram uit Mexico
 Zijn viool (1914)
 De zigeunerin (1914)
 De verwisseling onder het bed (1914)
 Liefde waakt (1914)
 De Bloemen, die de ziel vertroosten (1914)
 Heilig recht (1914)
 Weergevonden (1914)
 Luchtkastelen (1914)
 De Vloek van het testament (1915)

References 

1854 births
1926 deaths
Dutch male film actors
Dutch male silent film actors
Dutch film directors
Male actors from Amsterdam
Articles containing video clips
20th-century Dutch people